Lescar is a commune in the Pyrénées-Atlantiques department and Nouvelle-Aquitaine region of south-western France.

Lescar is the site of the Roman city known variously as Benearnum,  Beneharnum or Civitas Benarnensium, the location providing the name for the later region of Béarn.

In 841, Benearnum was razed by the Vikings and Morlaàs became the Béarnaise capital. However, from the twelfth century a new city grew up at Lescar. Lescar Cathedral was built during this period, and was the seat of the Diocese of Lescar until 1801. The remains of the last monarchs of all Navarre Queen Catherine I (†1517) and King John III (†1516) lie at the cathedral.

Today, Lescar is primarily a suburb of the nearby town of Pau. The commune of Lescar has joined together with 30 neighbouring communes to establish the Communauté d'agglomération Pau Béarn Pyrénées which provides a framework within which local tasks are carried out together.

Population

Twin towns
 L'Alfàs del Pi,  Spain

See also
Communes of the Pyrénées-Atlantiques department

References

Communes of Pyrénées-Atlantiques
Pyrénées-Atlantiques communes articles needing translation from French Wikipedia